Portrait of a Lady is an oil on canvas painting by Gustav Klimt, painted between 1916 and 1917.  The painting measures .  It depicts a portrait of a female figure, composed in an unusually lively expressionistic style. It was acquired by the Galleria Ricci-Oddi in Piacenza in 1925.

In 1996, X-ray analysis revealed that the portrait was an overpainted version of Klimt's lost work Portrait of a Young Lady (in hat and with scarf), which disappeared in 1917.  The original portrait showed a woman with whom Klimt is believed to have had a love affair, but after she died suddenly, he painted over the work.

The painting was believed stolen on 22 February 1997, shortly before a special exhibition was planned at the gallery, during the renovation of the building. The frame was found discarded on the roof next to a skylight, which was, however, too small for the painting to have been removed through.

In April 1997, the Italian police authorities discovered a high-quality forgery at Ventimiglia, on the Italian border with France, in a package addressed to the former Italian Prime Minister Bettino Craxi who was hiding from the law in Hammamet, Tunisia.  The "theft" in February may have been staged shortly before the exhibition to cover up the swap of the original painting with the forgery some months before. The case was reopened in 2014 according to the new facts. Various copies of the painting are known to the Italian police.

In December 2019, 23 years after the theft, a bag containing what was believed to be the missing painting was recovered from a recess in an exterior wall of the gallery by gardeners clearing away ivy, which had overgrown over the recess at least 10 years prior. The painting was confirmed to be the missing Portrait of a Lady the following month. Tests will be carried out to confirm if the painting had been in the wall since it was stolen, or placed in there later. The painting will then go back on display at the gallery.

See also
1917 in art
List of paintings by Gustav Klimt
List of stolen paintings

Sources
 Video news about the robbery, 1997

References

Paintings by Gustav Klimt
Stolen works of art
Recovered works of art
Portraits of women
1917 paintings
Oil on canvas paintings